Eva, released in the United Kingdom as Eve, is a 1962 Italian-French co-production drama film directed by Joseph Losey and starring Jeanne Moreau, Stanley Baker, and Virna Lisi. Its screenplay is adapted from James Hadley Chase's 1945 novel Eve.

Plot summary
Tyvian Jones, a Welsh author from a working-class coal mining background, comes to Venice, rich and famous from the success of his first novel and its film adaptation by the Italian director Sergio Branco Mallone. Sergio and Tyvian compete for the affections of Sergio's assistant Francesca, who falls in love with Tyvian and gets engaged to him, but wants to keep her job with Sergio. Tyvian resents Sergio's demands on Francesca's time, but still accepts an advance from Sergio to begin writing a new novel, which Sergio hopes to film.

Francesca leaves on a business trip to Rome with Sergio, and Tyvian returns to his Venice house to find it occupied by local businessman Pieri and his "friend", the erotic call girl Eva "Eve" Olivieri. The couple broke in to take shelter after their boat's rudder failed in a storm. Initially angry, Tyvian finds himself strongly attracted to Eve and, after throwing Pieri out of the house, tries unsuccessfully to seduce her. Eve knocks him unconscious and leaves.

Tyvian tracks Eve to her penthouse apartment in Rome, where she has many clients. After pursuing her for several days, he finally succeeds in having sex with her. She indicates her primary interest is money, and warns him not to fall in love with her. His friends see him out with Eve, causing an upset Francesca to confront him and Sergio to berate and threaten him. Despite this negative fallout, Tyvian cannot resist spending an expensive weekend in Venice with Eve, where he reveals to her that his best-selling book was actually written by his deceased brother. Tyvian has begun to drink heavily and ends up publicly humiliated and rejected by Eve, who used the weekend to make money gambling and connecting with wealthy new clients.

Tyvian marries Francesca.  Meanwhile, Sergio has discovered that Tyvian lied about his past and did not write the book published under his name, but cannot get Francesca to leave Tyvian. While Francesca is away working with Sergio, Tyvian trysts with Eve in his home. Francesca unexpectedly returns, discovers Tyvian with Eve, and, distraught, rushes away in a motorboat and dies in a fatal crash. The night of her funeral, Tyvian breaks into Eve's apartment seeking comfort, but Eve drives him out with a riding whip and pushes him into a garbage pile. Two years later, Sergio still mourns Francesca, while Tyvian haunts the bars of Venice and pursues a contemptuous Eve, who is planning to sail to the Greek islands with a wealthy Greek client.

Cast

Production
It was shot partly on location around Venice. The film's sets were designed by the art directors Richard Macdonald and Luigi Scaccianoce. Losey said he never would have normally chosen to make a film out of Chase's novel "but I made the film mine more than anything I have ever done."

Losey said later the producers made cuts without his permission and the film was a disappointment to him.

Critical reception
The New York Times concluded "Mr. Losey said the producer ruined it by cutting. The rejoinder is: He didn't cut it enough"; while in a similarly unfavourable review, Dennis Schwartz opined "The story itself is the film's main problem, because it is so unsettling and perverse. It never lets in any sunlight"; however Derek Winnert noted "Losey's dark thriller is really rather effective and underrated, and the actors are spot on in tailor-made roles."

References

External links 
 

1962 films
1962 drama films
English-language French films
English-language Italian films
Films scored by Michel Legrand
Films based on British novels
Films based on works by James Hadley Chase
Films directed by Joseph Losey
French drama films
Italian drama films
Films set in Venice
Films shot in Venice
1960s English-language films
1960s Italian films
1960s French films